The  is a railway line of Kyoto Tango Railway in Kyoto Prefecture, Japan. Trains on the line are operated by Willer Trains Inc. as part of its Kyoto Tango Railway system.

History
Building of the line was approved in 1953, with construction commencing in 1966, but being suspended in 1980 due to the financial constraints being experienced by JNR at the time.

In 1982 the Miyafuku Railway Co. was established to recommence construction, which resumed the following year.

The line opened in 1988, featuring 10 tunnels, including the 3215-meter Fukō Tunnel, the 2175-meter Shimoamazu Tunnel and the 2103-meter Tochiba Tunnel. The following year the company renamed itself the Kitakinki Tango Railway.

The line was electrified in 1996 to enable through services with the JR Fukuchiyama Line.

On April 1, 2015, the train operation business of Kitakinki Tango Railway was transferred to Willer Trains, Inc., which named the railway system the Kyoto Tango Railway. At this time, the name of Atsunakatonya Station was changed to Fukuchiyama-shimin-byōin-guchi Station. Unlike the Miyazu Line, the name of this line was not changed.

Station list 
 All stations located within Kyoto Prefecture.
 Legend: S - all trains stop; s - some trains stop; s - "Tango Aomatsu" 2 stops; | - all trains pass

See also
 List of railway lines in Japan

References

This article incorporates material from the corresponding article in the Japanese Wikipedia

Railway lines in Japan
Rail transport in Kyoto Prefecture
Japanese third-sector railway lines